Essential Selection Presents Music From The Motion Picture Human Traffic is a soundtrack album to the British independent film Human Traffic, both released in 1999.

It includes music by contemporary dance music producers. The second CD is mixed by British DJ Pete Tong.

Track listing

References

1999 albums
Comedy film soundtracks
1999 soundtrack albums
London Records albums